XXI Corps was a corps of the Union Army during the American Civil War.  It served as part of William S. Rosecrans's Army of the Cumberland and was in existence from January 9th to October 1863.  

After the Battle of Stone's River, General Rosecrans reorganized the "wings" of his army into three corps.  The left wing, under Thomas L. Crittenden, became the XXI Corps.  

Taking part in the Tullahoma Campaign, the XXI Corps was heavily engaged at Chickamauga on September 19–20, 1863, where it was nearly destroyed.  It was Rosecrans' mistaken decision to pull Thomas Wood's division of this corps to support George Thomas's XIV Corps that resulted in General James Longstreet's breakthrough against the Union center.  It should be added, though, that elements of XXI Corps, most notably William J. Palmer's division, aided Thomas in his successful rearguard action on Snodgrass Hill.  Along with the remnants of XX Corps, the corps reorganized into IV Corps shortly after the battle.

External links 
XXI Corps history

21
Military units and formations established in 1863
1863 establishments in the United States